
Gmina Lisewo is a rural gmina (administrative district) in Chełmno County, Kuyavian-Pomeranian Voivodeship, in north-central Poland.

Villages
Gmina Lisewo contains the villages and settlements of Bartlewo, Błachta, Chrusty, Drzonowo, Kamlarki, Kornatowo, Krajęcin, Krusin, Linowiec, Lipienek, Lisewo, Malankowo, Mgoszcz, Piątkowo, Pniewite, Strucfoń, Tytlewo and Wierzbowo.

Neighbouring gminas
Gmina Lisewo is bordered by the gminas of Chełmża, Papowo Biskupie, Płużnica and Stolno.

References
Polish official population figures 2006

Lisewo
Chełmno County